is a Japanese racing cyclist, who currently rides for UCI Continental team .

Career
He joined  starting in the 2013 season while he was still a student at the National Institute of Fitness and Sports in Kanoya. He won the Under-23 Japanese National Time Trial Championships in 2014.

Ishibashi became the sixth Japanese cyclist to participate in the Giro d'Italia when he rode in the 2015 edition. He withdrew from the race on the 9th stage.

Major results

2014
 1st  Time trial, National Under-23 Road Championships
 Asian Under-23 Road Championships
7th Time trial
9th Road race
2019
 4th Tour de Okinawa
 7th Overall Tour of Japan

References

External links

1992 births
Living people
Japanese male cyclists
Sportspeople from Aomori Prefecture